Irene is a city in Clay, Turner, and Yankton counties in South Dakota, United States. The population was 422 at the 2020 census. The portion of Irene that is located in Turner County is a part of the Sioux Falls, South Dakota metropolitan area, the portion located in Yankton County is part of the Yankton Micropolitan Statistical Area, and the portion located in Clay County is part of both the Vermillion Micropolitan Statistical Area and the Sioux City-Vermillion Combined Statistical Area. Irene is also host to the Irene Rodeo, held every summer.

Irene was laid out in 1893, and named after Irene Fry, the daughter of a first settler.

Geography
Irene is located at  (43.083655, -97.156594).

South Dakota Highway 46 runs east–west through the city. Irene is located approximately 18 miles west of I-29.

Demographics

2010 census
As of the census of 2010, there were 420 people, 172 households, and 102 families residing in the city. The racial makeup of the city was 98.6% White, 0.7% Native American, 0.2% Asian, 0.2% from other races, and 0.2% from two or more races. Hispanic or Latino of any race were 0.5% of the population.

There were 172 households, of which 29.7% had children under the age of 18 living with them, 44.2% were married couples living together, 9.9% had a female householder with no husband present, 5.2% had a male householder with no wife present, and 40.7% were non-families. 35.5% of all households were made up of individuals, and 15.7% had someone living alone who was 65 years of age or older. The average household size was 2.18 and the average family size was 2.78.

The median age in the city was 43.1 years. 22.6% of residents were under the age of 18; 5% were between the ages of 18 and 24; 25.2% were from 25 to 44; 26.4% were from 45 to 64; and 20.7% were 65 years of age or older. The gender makeup of the city was 44.0% male and 56.0% female.

2000 census
As of the census of 2000, there were 432 people, 169 households, and 110 families residing in the city. The population density was 1,790.0 people per square mile (695.0/km2). There were 189 housing units at an average density of 783.1 per square mile (304.1/km2). The racial makeup of the city was 99.77% White and 0.23% Native American.

There were 169 households, out of which 26.0% had children under the age of 18 living with them, 56.8% were married couples living together, 7.1% had a female householder with no husband present, and 34.9% were non-families. 32.5% of all households were made up of individuals, and 19.5% had someone living alone who was 65 years of age or older. The average household size was 2.21 and the average family size was 2.76.

In the city, the population was spread out, with 19.7% under the age of 18, 6.9% from 18 to 24, 20.1% from 25 to 44, 22.0% from 45 to 64, and 31.3% who were 65 years of age or older. The median age was 47 years. For every 100 females, there were 79.3 males. For every 100 females age 18 and over, there were 70.9 males.

The median income for a household in the city was $30,500, and the median income for a family was $39,688. Males had a median income of $29,583 versus $20,000 for females. The per capita income for the city was $14,983. About 4.7% of families and 9.0% of the population were below the poverty line, including 10.8% of those under age 18 and 11.8% of those age 65 or over.

See also
 List of cities in South Dakota

References

External links

 

Cities in South Dakota
Cities in Clay County, South Dakota
Cities in Turner County, South Dakota
Cities in Yankton County, South Dakota
Sioux Falls, South Dakota metropolitan area
Populated places established in 1895
1895 establishments in South Dakota